Mohammed Ali Mahmoud is an Iraqi politician who held various ministerial positions during the monarchy in Iraq.

Life 
He was the clerk of the Iraqi Law School after it reopened in 1919, and was succeeded by Ibrahim al-Waez after graduating in the second year.

He succeeded Jaafar Abul-Taman as Minister of Finance in Hikmat Suleiman's ministry in 1937.He was appointed Minister without Ministry in the last days of Rashid Ali Al-Kilani's third ministry and then Minister of Works and Transport in Rashid Ali Al-Kilani's fourth ministry in 1941.

He was then sentenced to five years in prison in May 1941.

He then served as justice minister in the seventh Ministry of al Madfai and the second ministry of Al Jamali and the twelfth Ministry of Al Saaid, as well as deputy prime minister in the first Jamali ministry. And the position of acting Minister of Construction, in addition to the position of Minister of Justice in 1955 succeeding to the resigned Minister Abdel Majeed Mahmoud El Qura Ghuli.

References 

Finance ministers of Iraq